Thomas Bacon (fl. 1336) was an English judge, being the Justice of the Common Pleas. He held the post from 30 December 1329 to 28 January 1332. He left to become a Justice of the King's Bench.

References

Justices of the King's Bench
Year of birth missing
14th-century deaths
Justices of the Common Pleas
14th-century English judges